Tehuacán may refer to:

Places
In Mexico
 Tehuacán Municipality, Puebla
 Tehuacán, Puebla
 Tehuacán Airport, Puebla
 Tehuacán Valley
 Tehuacán, Ocampo in Ocampo Municipality, Tamaulipas

Tehuacan:
 Tehuacan, Ocosingo
 Tehuacan, Tonalá
 Tehuacan, Tumbalá
 Tehuacan, Villaflores

In El Salvador
 Tehuacán (sitio arqueológico)